The Miracle Worker is a 1979 American made-for-television biographical film based on the 1959 play of the same title by William Gibson, which originated as a 1957 broadcast of the television anthology series Playhouse 90. Gibson's original source material was The Story of My Life, the 1903 autobiography of Helen Keller. The play was adapted for the screen before, in 1962.

The film is based on the life of Helen Keller and Annie Sullivan's struggles to teaching her. It starred Patty Duke (who played Helen Keller in the original 1962 film, for which she won the Oscar) as Annie Sullivan and Melissa Gilbert as Helen Keller. It produced a TV sequel, Helen Keller: The Miracle Continues in 1984.

Plot 
Young Helen Keller (Melissa Gilbert), blind, deaf, and mute since infancy, is in danger of being sent to an institution. Her inability to communicate has left her frustrated and violent. In desperation, her parents seek help from the Perkins Institute, which sends them a "half-blind Yankee schoolgirl" named Annie Sullivan (Patty Duke) to tutor their daughter. Through persistence and love, and sheer stubbornness, Annie breaks through Helen's walls of silence and darkness and teaches her to communicate.

Cast
 Melissa Gilbert as Helen Keller
 Patty Duke as Annie Sullivan
 Charles Siebert as Captain Arthur H. Keller
 Diana Muldaur as Kate Adams Keller
 Stanley Wells as James Keller
 Anne Seymour as Aunt Evelyn
 Hilda Haynes as Viney
 Byron Green as Percy
 Noniece Williams as Martha
 Titos Vandis as Anagnos
 Jonathan Gilbert as voice of Jimmy Sullivan (Anne's younger brother who died in childhood while both were living at Tewksberry Hospital Almshouse).

Production
Melissa Gilbert heavily campaigned Meredith Baxter to play the role of Anne Sullivan.

British actress, Lynne Frederick, had expressed interest playing Anne Sullivan. Despite her lengthy and accomplished body of work, the producers told Frederick that she was "far too pretty" for the part.

Patty Duke, who played Anne Sullivan, previously played the role of Helen Keller in the 1962 film of the same title.

Awards and nominations

See also
 The Miracle Worker (2000 film)
 Black (2005 film)
 List of films featuring the deaf and hard of hearing

References

External links
 

1979 television films
1979 films
1970s biographical drama films
1979
American biographical drama films
Remakes of American films
Films scored by Billy Goldenberg
Helen Keller
Films about blind people
Films about deaf people
Films about educators
Television remakes of films
NBC network original films
Primetime Emmy Award for Outstanding Made for Television Movie winners
Films directed by Paul Aaron
1970s American films
Films about disability